The  Carl Blessing Outbuildings are a smokehouse and cellar located on the Carl Blessing farm northwest of Jerome, Idaho. The two buildings were constructed by Carl Blessing shortly after he purchased his farm in 1918. Both buildings were used to store food; the smokehouse held smoked meats, while the cellar held produce such as apples. The buildings were built with lava rock and are considered good examples of storage buildings built from the rock by a farmer.

The buildings were added to the National Register of Historic Places on September 8, 1983.

References

See also
 List of National Historic Landmarks in Idaho
 National Register of Historic Places listings in Jerome County, Idaho

1918 establishments in Idaho
Agricultural buildings and structures on the National Register of Historic Places in Idaho
Commercial buildings completed in 1918
Buildings and structures in Jerome County, Idaho
National Register of Historic Places in Jerome County, Idaho